Paris Baguette is a South Korean multinational chain of bakery-cafés, owned by the SPC Group and headquartered in Seoul. In 1986, it was established as a subsidiary of Shani Co., Ltd., and opened the first 'Paris Baguette' in Gwanghwamun, Seoul, and the first high-end bakery 'Paris Croissant' in Itaewon the following year, and the corporate name changed to the same as the brand name. 

In 1988, the franchise brand, Paris Baguette grew into the No. 1 bakery in Korea in 2004, branching out to local subsidiaries in the United States, Vietnam, Singapore, etc. By establishing Paris Baguette it has become a global company.

Franchises

Paris Baguette
In 1988, Paris Croissant launched Paris Baguette, a popular bakery café franchise brand. As of May 2022, the chain had over 3,600 retail stores in South Korea and 99 stores in the United States. Paris Baguette also launched almost 185 retail stores in China, Vietnam, Singapore and France.

Caffè Pascucci 
Caffè Pascucci is an Italian espresso café franchise.

Other 
Other franchises of Paris Croissant include LINA's and Tamati (sandwich), Passion5 (upscale dessert gallery), L’atelier (café restaurant). It also handles the Korean branch of Jamba Juice (smoothie).

Labor practices 
In 2022 a boycott of Paris Baguette took off after a worker at a Pyeongtaek factory was fatally crushed by a sauce mixing machine. Shortly before the incident another worker at the factory had sustained an injury to their hand from a production machine but was not sent to the hospital since they were not a full time worker. Various Korean trade unions have condemned the company due to a history of safety issues and union busting.

References

External links
 
 
 

South Korean brands
Bakeries of South Korea
SPC Group
Companies based in Seoul